Superlek Sorn E-Sarn (or spelt Superlek Sorn E Sarn, Superlek Sorn Isan) was a former Thai Muay Thai fighter who fought in the 80s–90s. He was also called Superlek Chor Sawat (ซุปเปอร์เล็ก ช.สวัสดิ์).

Biography & career
Superlek was born in Ubon Ratchathani province, Isan (northeastern region of Thailand), he is well known for being a heavy puncher, as he often defeats his opponents by knockout with punches, which earned him the nickname "Remote Puncher". He has been praised for his heavy punches which have been compared to the likes former fighter, Danchai "White Tiger" Yontarakit. He battled several famous fighters in the same era such as Cherry Sor Wanich, Namphon Nongkee Pahuyuth, Namkabuan Nongkee Pahuyuth, Jaroenthong Kiatbanchong, Therdkiat Sitthepitak, Jongsanan Fairtex, Wangchannoi Sor Palangchai, Neutharonee Tongraja, Krirkchai Sor Khettalingchan, Rittichai Lookchaomaesaitong, Pon Narupai, Oley Kiatoneway, Dokmaipa Por Pongsawang, Matee Jedeepitak, Den Muangsurin, Phetchdum Sor Badin, Sangtiennoi Sor.Rungroj, Nuengsiam Keatwichean. He is also known for his thrilling fight against the legendary Dutch kick boxer Ramon Dekkers on August 31, 1990 at Lumpinee Stadium organized by Songchai Rattanasuban, a famous promoter, the result was by points decision win after five rounds. His highest earned purse is 250,000 baht.

After retirement, he owns a stone crushing plant and owns dozens of trucks at his native. His son is also a fighter under Vichairachanon Khadpo's stable named Padsaenlek Sor Sumalee or Padsaenlek Rachanon.

He died in April 2013 due to sepsis and alcoholism, at 44 years old.

Titles
Lumpinee Stadium
 1989 Lumpinee Stadium Junior featherweight (122 lbs)
 1993 Lumpinee Stadium Featherweight (126 lbs)

Fight record

|-  style="background:#cfc;"
| 1998- || Win ||align=left| John Wayne Parr || Songchai Promotion|| Thailand || KO (right cross) || 4 ||
|-  style="background:#cfc;"
| 1997-12 || Win ||align=left| Manu N'toh || King's Birthday|| Thailand || Decision || 5 ||3:00
|-  style="background:#fbb;"
| 1996-02-27 || Loss ||align=left| Keng Singnakonkhui || Lumpinee Stadium || Bangkok, Thailand || Decision || 5|| 3:00
|-  style="background:#cfc;"
| 1995-10-13 || Win ||align=left| Jaroenwit Tor.Chalermchai || Lumpinee Stadium || Bangkok, Thailand ||  KO (Punches) || ||
|-  style="background:#cfc;"
| 1994-10-04 || Win ||align=left| Wanlop Sor.Thepthong || Lumpinee Stadium || Bangkok, Thailand ||  KO (Punches) || 1||
|-  style="background:#cfc;"
| 1994-09-12 || Win||align=left| Chandet Sor Prantalay || Lumpinee Stadium || Bangkok, Thailand || KO (Right Cross) || 3||
|-  style="background:#cfc;"
| 1994 || Win||align=left| Ramon Dekkers || Lumpinee Stadium || Bangkok, Thailand || Decision (Unanimous) || 5 || 3:00
|-  style="background:#fbb;"
| 1994-08-22 || Loss ||align=left| Chodchoy Shuchokchai || Rajadamnern Stadium || Bangkok, Thailand ||  Decision || 5 || 3:00
|-  style="background:#cfc;"
| 1994-07-25 || Win||align=left| Taweechai Wor.Preecha || Rajadamnern Stadium || Bangkok, Thailand || Decision|| 5 ||3:00
|-  style="background:#;"
| 1994-05-31 || ||align=left| Wanlop Sor.Thepthong || Lumpinee Stadium || Bangkok, Thailand ||  || ||
|-  style="background:#fbb;"
| 1994-04-29 || Loss||align=left| Rainbow Sor Prantalay || Lumpinee Stadium || Bangkok, Thailand || Decision || 5 || 3:00
|-  style="background:#cfc;"
| 1994-01-31 || Win ||align=left| Rittichai Lookchaomaesaitong|| Rajadamnern Stadium || Bangkok, Thailand || Decision || 5 || 3:00
|-  style="background:#cfc;"
| 1994-01-14 || Win||align=left| Jaroenthong Kiatbanchong || Lumpinee Stadium || Bangkok, Thailand || Decision|| 5 ||3:00

|-  style="background:#fbb;"
| ?|| Loss ||align=left| Den Muangsurin || Lumpinee Stadium || Bangkok, Thailand || Decision || 5 || 3:00

|-  style="background:#cfc;"
| 1993-06-08|| Win||align=left| Mathee Jadeepitak || Lumpinee Stadium || Bangkok, Thailand || Decision || 5 || 3:00
|-  style="background:#fbb;"
| 1993-04-24|| Loss ||align=left| Oley Kiatoneway || Lumpinee Stadium || Bangkok, Thailand || Decision || 5 || 3:00
|-  style="background:#fbb;"
| 1993-04-06|| Loss ||align=left| Jongsanan Luklangbangkaew || Lumpinee Stadium || Bangkok, Thailand || Decision || 5 || 3:00  
|-
! style=background:white colspan=9 |
|-  style="background:#cfc;"
| 1993-03-10 || Win||align=left| Neungsiam Kiatwichian || Rajadamnern Stadium || Bangkok, Thailand || TKO (Punches) || 2 ||
|-  style="background:#c5d2ea;"
| 1993-02-15|| Draw||align=left| Boonlai Sor.Thanikul || Rajadamnern Stadium || Bangkok, Thailand || Decision || 5 || 3:00
|-  style="background:#cfc;"
| 1992-12-29 || Win||align=left| Nuathoranee Thongracha || Lumpinee Stadium || Bangkok, Thailand || TKO (Doctor Stoppage)|| 4 ||
|-  style="background:#cfc;"
| 1992-11-30 || Win||align=left| Cherry Sor Wanich || Rajadamnern Stadium || Bangkok, Thailand || KO (Punches) || 3 ||
|-  style="background:#cfc;"
| 1992-09-12 || Win||align=left| Chandet Sor Prantalay || Lumpinee Stadium || Bangkok, Thailand || KO || 3 ||
|-  style="background:#cfc;"
| 1992-08-07 || Win ||align=left| Namphon Nongkee Pahuyuth || Lumpinee Stadium || Bangkok, Thailand || KO || 4 ||
|-  style="background:#cfc;"
| 1992-07-21|| Win ||align=left| Oley Kiatoneway || Lumpinee Stadium ||  Bangkok, Thailand|| KO (Punches) || 3 ||
|-  style="background:#cfc;"
| 1992-05-30 || Win||align=left| Coban Lookchaomaesaitong || Lumpinee Stadium || Bangkok, Thailand || Decision || 5 || 3:00
|-  style="background:#fbb;"
| 1992-04-24 || Loss||align=left| Chandet Sor Prantalay || Lumpinee Stadium || Bangkok, Thailand || Decision || 5 || 3:00
|-  style="background:#cfc;"
| 1992-03-28 || Win||align=left| Prabphairi Sitprapom|| Lumpinee Stadium || Bangkok, Thailand || KO || 1 ||
|-  style="background:#fbb;"
| 1992-02-28 || Loss||align=left| Rittichai Lookchaomaesaitong||  || Samut Prakan, Thailand || Decision || 5 || 3:00
|-  style="background:#fbb;"
| 1991-12-27|| Loss||align=left| Boonlai Sor.Thanikul || Lumpinee Stadium || Bangkok, Thailand || Decision || 5 || 3:00

|-  style="background:#fbb;"
| 1991-11-03 || Loss||align=left| Jaroenthong Kiatbanchong || Onesongchai || New Zealand || Decision|| 5 || 3:00

|-  style="background:#cfc;"
| 1991-09-27 || Win||align=left| Samingnoi Tankaphan|| Lumpinee Stadium || Bangkok, Thailand || KO (Punches)|| 3 ||
|-  style="background:#fbb;"
| 1991-08-17 || Loss||align=left| Sanit Wichitkiriagkrai || Lumpinee Stadium || Bangkok, Thailand || Decision|| 5 || 3:00
|-  style="background:#cfc;"
| 1991-07-30 || Win ||align=left| Namphon Nongkee Pahuyuth || Lumpinee Stadium || Bangkok, Thailand || Decision  || 5 || 3:00
|-  style="background:#fbb;"
| 1991-06-14 || Loss||align=left| Wangchannoi Sor Palangchai  || Lumpinee Stadium ||  Bangkok, Thailand  || Decision || 5 || 3:00
|-
! style=background:white colspan=9 |
|-  style="background:#fbb;"
| 1991-05-10 || Loss||align=left| Petdam Sityodtong || Lumpinee Stadium || Bangkok, Thailand || Decision || 5 || 3:00 
|-
! style=background:white colspan=9 |
|-  style="background:#cfc;"
| 1991-03-29 || Win ||align=left| Namphon Nongkee Pahuyuth || Lumpinee Stadium || Bangkok, Thailand || Decision  || 5 || 3:00
|-  style="background:#fbb;"
| 1991-02-15 || Loss||align=left| Sangtiennoi Sor.Rungroj ||  || Phra Nakhon Si Ayutthaya, Thailand || Decision || 5 || 3:00
|-  style="background:#fbb;"
| 1990-12-18 || Loss ||align=left| Wangchannoi Sor Palangchai || Lumpinee Stadium || Bangkok, Thailand || Decision || 5 ||3:00
|-  style="background:#cfc;"
| 1990-11-27 || Win||align=left| Cherry Sor Wanich || Lumpinee Stadium || Bangkok, Thailand || KO (Punches)|| 5 ||
|-  style="background:#fbb;"
| 1990-10-12 || Loss ||align=left| Cherry Sor Wanich || Lumpinee Stadium || Bangkok, Thailand || Decision|| 5 ||3:00
|-  style="background:#cfc;"
| 1990-08-31 || Win ||align=left| Ramon Dekkers || Lumpinee Stadium || Bangkok, Thailand || Decision  || 5 || 3:00
|-  style="background:#cfc;"
| 1990-08-07 || Win ||align=left| Wangchannoi Sor Palangchai || Lumpinee Stadium || Bangkok, Thailand || Decision  || 5 || 3:00

|-  style="background:#cfc;"
| 1990-06-29 || Win ||align=left| Namphon Nongkee Pahuyuth || Lumpinee Stadium || Bangkok, Thailand || Decision  || 5 || 3:00

|-  style="background:#cfc;"
| 1990-05-27 || Win ||align=left| Joao Vieira ||  || Netherlands|| Decision  || 5 || 3:00

|-  style="background:#fbb;"
| 1990-03-30 || Loss ||align=left| Cherry Sor Wanich || Lumpinee Stadium || Bangkok, Thailand || TKO (Knees)|| 4 ||
|-  style="background:#cfc;"
| 1990-03-06 || Win ||align=left| Jaroenthong Kiatbanchong || Lumpinee Stadium || Bangkok, Thailand || TKO|| 3 ||
|-  style="background:#cfc;"
| 1990-02-06 || Win ||align=left| Chanchai Sor Tamarangsri || Lumpinee Stadium || Bangkok, Thailand || Decision  || 5 || 3:00

|-  style="background:#cfc;"
| 1990-01-16 || Win||align=left| Grandprixnoi Muangchaiyaphum|| Lumpinee Stadium || Bangkok, Thailand || KO || 3||  

|-  style="background:#cfc;"
| 1989-12-18 || Win||align=left| Sanphet Lukrangksee|| Lumpinee Stadium || Bangkok, Thailand || Decision || 5 || 3:00 

|-  style="background:#fbb;"
| 1989-11-07 || Loss ||align=left| Therdkiat Sitthepitak || Lumpinee Stadium || Bangkok, Thailand || Decision || 5 || 3:00 
|-
! style=background:white colspan=9 |
|-  style="background:#c5d2ea;"
| 1989-10-06 || NC ||align=left| Wangchannoi Sor Palangchai || Lumpinee Stadium || Bangkok, Thailand || No Contest (referee stoppage)|| 5||
|-
! style=background:white colspan=9 |

|-  style="background:#cfc;"
| 1989-08-15|| Win||align=left| Dokmaipa Por Pongsawang || Lumpinee Stadium || Bangkok, Thailand || Decision || 5 || 3:00 

|-  style="background:#cfc;"
| 1989-07-11||Win ||align=left| Pon Narupai  || Lumpinee Stadium || Bangkok, Thailand || Decision || 5||3:00

|-  style="background:#cfc;"
| 1989-06-16||Win ||align=left| Den Muangsurin || Lumpinee Stadium || Bangkok, Thailand || Decision || 5||3:00

|-  style="background:#cfc;"
| 1989-05-15||Win ||align=left| Phetsiam Kiatsingnoi || Lumpinee Stadium || Bangkok, Thailand || KO  || 4||

|-  style="background:#fbb;"
| 1989-03-28 || Loss||align=left| Rittichai Lookchaomaesaitong|| Lumpinee Stadium || Bangkok, Thailand || Decision  || 5 || 3:00

|-  style="background:#cfc;"
| 1989-03-06||Win ||align=left| Koratnoi Sakpipat  || Lumpinee Stadium || Bangkok, Thailand || Decision || 5||3:00

|-  style="background:#cfc;"
| 1989-02-10|| Win ||align=left| Piewpong Hongparichart ||  || Bangkok, Thailand || Decision ||5  ||3:00
|-  style="background:#cfc;"
| 1989-01-23|| Win ||align=left| Rittichai Lookchaomaesaitong || Rajadamnern Stadium || Bangkok, Thailand || Decision ||5  ||3:00
|-  style="background:#fbb;"
| 1988-12-15|| Loss ||align=left| Kaonar Bualuangprakanphay || Rajadamnern Stadium || Bangkok, Thailand || Decision || 5 || 3:00
|-  style="background:#fbb;"
| 1988-11-26|| Loss ||align=left| Lukhiod Muangsurin || Lumpinee Stadium || Bangkok, Thailand || Decision || 5 || 3:00
|-  style="background:#cfc;"
| 1988-11-03|| Win||align=left| Piewpong Hongphaparichat || Rajadamnern Stadium || Bangkok, Thailand || Decision || 5 || 3:00
|-  style="background:#fbb;"
| 1988-10-11|| Loss ||align=left| Kaonam Bualuangprakanpay || Lumpinee Stadium || Bangkok, Thailand || Decision || 5 || 3:00
|-  style="background:#cfc;"
| 1988-06-10|| Win ||align=left| Mahachok Singkhonpahn || Lumpinee Stadium || Bangkok, Thailand || KO || 2 ||
|-  style="background:#fbb;"
| 1988-04-12|| Loss ||align=left| Wantongchai Sityodtong || Lumpinee Stadium || Bangkok, Thailand || Decision || 5 || 3:00 

|-  style="background:#fbb;"
| 1987-01-06|| Loss ||align=left| Muangchai Kittikasem ||  || Bangkok, Thailand || KO (Punches)|| 2 ||  
|-
| colspan=9 | Legend:

References

Deaths from sepsis
1969 births
2013 deaths
Superlek Sorn E-Sarn
Superlek Sorn E-Sarn
Featherweight kickboxers